The 2000 AFC Futsal Championship was held in Bangkok, Thailand from 5 May to 12 May 2000. The tournament acted as a qualifying tournament for the 2000 FIFA Futsal World Championship in Guatemala.

Venue

Draw

Group stage

Group A

Group B

Knockout stage

Semi-finals

Third place play-off

Final

Awards 

 Top Scorer
 Therdsak Chaiman (11 goals)

References

 Futsal Planet

AFC Futsal Championship
Fut
Championship
International futsal competitions hosted by Thailand
2000 in Bangkok
Sport in Bangkok